William Motti (born 25 July 1964 in Bondy) is a retired French decathlete.

His personal best of 8327 points were achieved at the Europa cup in Arles (FR)1987.

Achievements

External links

1964 births
Living people
French decathletes
Athletes (track and field) at the 1984 Summer Olympics
Athletes (track and field) at the 1992 Summer Olympics
Olympic athletes of France